Anna Louise Nicholls (born 30 October 1997) is an English cricketer who last played for Yorkshire in 2018. She plays as a wicket-keeper and right-handed batter. She previously played for Buckinghamshire and Middlesex, as well as Yorkshire Diamonds in the Women's Cricket Super League.

Early life
Nicholls was born on 30 October 1997 in Barnet, Greater London.

Domestic career
Nicholls made her county debut in 2011, for Buckinghamshire against Leicestershire. This was the only match she played for Buckinghamshire, as she moved to Middlesex ahead of the 2012 season. She played for Middlesex until 2016, with her best performance coming in the 2014 Women's County Championship, where she scored 80 runs, with a high score of 41. In 2017, Nicholls moved to Yorkshire, and hit her maiden county half-century that season in the County Championship. Altogether, she hit 140 runs in the competition, as well as taking five catches and making three stumpings. Nicholls played one more season for Yorkshire in 2018 but has not appeared since.

Nicholls also played for Yorkshire Diamonds in the Women's Cricket Super League in 2016 and 2017. Overall, she played 6 matches, scoring 11 runs and making 4 stumpings.

References

External links

1997 births
Living people
People from Chipping Barnet
Buckinghamshire women cricketers
Middlesex women cricketers
Yorkshire women cricketers
Yorkshire Diamonds cricketers